A star number is a centered figurate number, a centered hexagram (six-pointed star), such as the Star of David, or the board Chinese checkers is played on.

The nth star number is given by the formula Sn = 6n(n − 1) + 1. The first 43 star numbers are 1, 13, 37, 73, 121, 181, 253, 337, 433, 541, 661, 793, 937, 1093, 1261, 1441, 1633, 1837, 2053, 2281, 2521, 2773, 3037, 3313, 3601, 3901, 4213, 4537, 4873, 5221, 5581, 5953, 6337, 6733, 7141, 7561, 7993, 8437, 8893, 9361, 9841, 10333, 10837 

The digital root of a star number is always 1 or 4, and progresses in the sequence 1, 4, 1. The last two digits of a star number in base 10 are always 01, 13, 21, 33, 37, 41, 53, 61, 73, 81, or 93.

Unique among the star numbers is 35113, since its prime factors (i.e., 13, 37 and 73) are also consecutive star numbers.

Relationships to other kinds of numbers 
Geometrically, the nth star number is made up of a central point and 12 copies of the (n−1)th triangular number — making it numerically equal to the nth centered dodecagonal number, but differently arranged.

Infinitely many star numbers are also triangular numbers, the first four being S1 = 1 = T1, S7 = 253 = T22, S91 = 49141 = T313, and S1261 = 9533161 = T4366 .

Infinitely many star numbers are also square numbers, the first four being S1 = 12, S5 = 121 = 112, S45 = 11881 = 1092, and S441 = 1164241 = 10792 , for square stars .

A star prime is a star number that is prime. The first few star primes  are
13, 37, 73, 181, 337, 433, 541, 661, 937.

A superstar prime is a star prime whose prime index is also a star number. The first two such numbers are 661 and 1750255921.

A reverse superstar prime is a star number whose index is a star prime. The first few such numbers are 937, 7993, 31537, 195481, 679393, 1122337, 1752841, 2617561, 5262193.

The term "star number" or "stellate number" is occasionally used to refer to octagonal numbers.

Other properties
The harmonic series of unit fractions with the star numbers as denominators is:

The alternating series of unit fractions with the star numbers as denominators is:

See also
 Centered hexagonal number

References 

Figurate numbers